Itaoca is a municipality in the state of São Paulo in Brazil. The population is 3,330 (2020 est.) in an area of 183 km². The elevation is 155 m.

References

Municipalities in São Paulo (state)
Portuguese words affected by the 1990 spelling reform